"Mimi" is a popular song written by Richard Rodgers, with words by Lorenz Hart. It was featured in the movie Love Me Tonight (1932), in which it was first sung by Maurice Chevalier to Jeanette MacDonald, then later reprised by the entire company. Sergio Franchi performed this song January 2, 1964 
on the ABC Television special, Victor Borge At Carnegie Hall. Sergio Franchi also recorded "Mimi" on his 1963 RCA Victor Red Seal album. Women In My Life.

References

Songs with music by Richard Rodgers
Songs with lyrics by Lorenz Hart
1932 songs
Maurice Chevalier songs